Multi-wavelength anomalous diffraction (sometimes Multi-wavelength anomalous dispersion; abbreviated MAD) is a technique used in X-ray crystallography that facilitates the determination of the three-dimensional structure of biological macromolecules (e.g. DNA, drug receptors) via solution of the phase problem.

MAD was developed by Wayne Hendrickson while working as a postdoctoral researcher under Jerome Karle at the United States Naval Research Laboratory. The mathematics upon which MAD (and progenitor Single wavelength anomalous dispersion) were based were developed by Jerome Karle, work for which he was awarded the 1985 Nobel Prize in Chemistry (along with Herbert Hauptman).

See also 
 Single wavelength anomalous dispersion (SAD)
 Multiple isomorphous replacement (MIR)
Anomalous scattering
Anomalous X-ray scattering
Patterson map

References

Further reading

External links
MAD phasing — an in depth tutorial with examples, illustrations, and references.
HHMI Bio for Wayne Hendrickson
Wayne Hendrickson Home Page
Hendrickson Laboratory Summary of Research
Jerome Karl Nobel Biography
NRL Recognition of Nobel Prize

Computer programs
The SSRL Absorption Package — 
CHOOCH — 
Shake-and-Bake (SnB) — 
SHELX —

Tutorials and examples

Crystallography